The Chats — are one of the three subgroups of Tom Tatar group of Siberian Tatars. Their traditional areas of settlement are on the rivers Ob, Chik, Uen', and Chaus in Kozhevnikovsky District, Tomsk Oblast, and in Kolyvansky and Moshkovsky districts, Novosibirsk Oblast since the 8th century, later also on the territory of modern Shegarsky, Tomsky, Kochenyovsky, Bolotninsky, Novosibirsky, Toguchinsky, Iskitimsky, Ordynsky districts, and in the cities of Tomsk, Novosibirsk, and Berdsk.

The Chats (along with other related groups) are Sunni Muslims.

References

Sources

Siberian Tatars
Novosibirsk Oblast
Tomsk Oblast
Indigenous peoples of North Asia